China National Highway 330 (G330) runs northwest from Wenzhou, Zhejiang towards Shouchang, Zhejiang. It is 327 kilometres in length.

Route and distance

See also 

 China National Highways

Transport in Zhejiang
330